Kozlovo is a rural locality (a village) in Kaluga Urban Okrug, Kaluga Oblast, Russia.

References 

Rural localities in Kaluga Oblast